Kapurchal (also Romanized as Kapūrchāl, Kapūr Chāl, and Kopūr Chāl; also known as Bāzār Kopūr Chāl and Kavarchal) is a village in Chahar Farizeh Rural District, in the Central District of Bandar-e Anzali County, Gilan Province, Iran. At the 2006 census, its population was 1,838, in 561 families.

References 

Populated places in Bandar-e Anzali County